Temarrick Hemingway (born July 30, 1993) is an American football tight end who is a free agent. He played college football at South Carolina State and was drafted by the Los Angeles Rams in the sixth round of the 2016 NFL Draft.

College career
Hemingway played college football for South Carolina State.

Professional career

Los Angeles Rams
Hemingway was drafted by the Los Angeles Rams in the sixth round with the 177th overall selection in the 2016 NFL Draft.

Hemingway suffered a fractured fibula in the Rams' third preseason game and was ruled out for several weeks. He was placed on injured reserve on September 2, 2017.

On September 1, 2018, Hemingway was waived by the Rams and was signed to the practice squad the next day. He was released on September 18, 2018.

Denver Broncos
On October 2, 2018, Hemingway was signed to the Denver Broncos' practice squad. He was promoted to the active roster on November 27, 2018.

On May 13, 2019, Hemingway was waived by the Broncos.

Carolina Panthers
On May 14, 2019, Hemingway was claimed off waivers by the Carolina Panthers. He was waived during final roster cuts on August 31, 2019 and was signed to the practice squad the next day. He signed a reserve/future contract with the Panthers on December 30, 2019.

On September 5, 2020, Hemingway was released by the Panthers.

Washington Football Team
On September 17, 2020, Hemingway signed with the Washington Football Team's practice squad. He was elevated to the active roster on October 10 and October 17 for the team's weeks 5 and 6 games against the Los Angeles Rams and New York Giants, and reverted to the practice squad following each game. He was promoted to the active roster on October 22, 2020. Hemingway was placed on injured reserve on December 9, 2020, and was released on August 26, 2021.

Hemingway signed with the team's practice squad on November 16, 2021.

References

External links
South Carolina State bio

1993 births
Living people
African-American players of American football
American football tight ends
Carolina Panthers players
Denver Broncos players
Los Angeles Rams players
People from Loris, South Carolina
Players of American football from South Carolina
South Carolina State Bulldogs football players
Washington Football Team players
21st-century African-American sportspeople